Flindersia maculosa, commonly known as leopardwood or leopard tree, is a species of tree in the family Rutaceae and is endemic to inland areas of eastern Australia. It has mottled bark, simple leaves arranged in opposite pairs, white to cream-coloured flowers and fruit studded with rough points.

Description
The trunk is mottled due to the bark shedding in patches. The upper surface of the leaf is shiny and dark green, the lower side dull and paler.

Taxonomy
Leopardwood was first formally described in 1848 by John Lindley in Thomas Mitchell's Journal of an Expedition into the Interior of Tropical Australia. In 1963, George Bentham changed the name to Flindersia maculosa in Flora Australiensis.

Distribution and habitat
Flindersia maculosa grows on stony hills and sand plains from Hughenden in central Queensland to the Riverina district in south-western New South Wales and from Walgett to Ivanhoe and Broken Hill in that state.

Uses
Leopardwood is a useful fodder tree in drought periods but as the tree does not recuperate well, it should only be pollarded.
The wood of the tree is sometimes used to construct fence posts and pick handles.

Nectar from the buds, and gum from the bark has been used to make a sweet drink. The drink from the gum has been used as a remedy for diarrhea.

Ecology
Larvae of the moth Opodiphthera astrophela feed on the leopardwood tree. An unidentified beetle in the genus Anilara can cause serious damage to the leopardwood tree. The mistletoe Amyema lucasii grows almost exclusively on the F. maculosa.

Conservation statusFlindersia maculosa is classified as of "least concern" under the Queensland Government Nature Conservation Act 1992''.

Gallery

References

maculosa
Sapindales of Australia
Flora of New South Wales
Flora of Queensland
Trees of Australia
Plants described in 1848
Taxa named by John Lindley